A by-election was held for the New South Wales Legislative Assembly electorate of Lane Cove on 26 July 1930 because of the death of Bryce Walmsley.

Dates

Results

Bryce Walmsley died.

See also
Electoral results for the district of Lane Cove
List of New South Wales state by-elections

References

1930 elections in Australia
New South Wales state by-elections
1930s in New South Wales